The 56th District of the Iowa House of Representatives in the state of Iowa.

Current elected officials
Anne Osmundson is the representative currently representing the district.

Past representatives
The district has previously been represented by:
 Conrad R. Fisher, 1971–1973
 Charles W. Hutchins, 1973–1977
 Ernest W. Gilson, 1977–1979
 James O. Anderson, 1979–1983
 Betty Hoffmann-Bright, 1983–1985
 Donald R. Platt, 1985–1989
 Bill Trent, 1989–1991
 James F. Hahn, 1991–1993
 Jerry Welter, 1993–2001
 Gene Manternach, 2001–2003
 Paul Wilderdyke, 2003–2007
 Matt Windschitl, 2007–2013
 Patti Ruff, 2013–2017
 Kristi Hager, 2017–2019
 Anne Osmundson, 2019–present

References

056